The Women's individual table tennis – Class 6 tournament at the 2020 Summer Paralympics in Tokyo took place between 25 and 30 August 2021 at Tokyo Metropolitan Gymnasium. Classes 6–10 were for athletes with a physical impairment in their upper body, and who compete in a standing position. The lower the number, the greater the impact the impairment was on an athlete's ability to compete.

In the preliminary stage, athletes competed in three groups of three. The winners and runners-up of each group qualified for the knock-out stage. In this edition of the Games, no bronze medal match was held. The losers of each semifinal were automatically awarded a bronze medal.

Results
All times are local time in UTC+9.

Main bracket

Final rounds

Preliminary round

Group A

Group B

Group C

References

Women's individual - Class 6